Hitovi i legende is the first live album of the Croatian rock band Aerodrom, released through Croatia Records in November 2009. The album was recorded in "Tvornica Kulture" club in Zagreb on 13 December 2008. The band consisted of Jurica Pađen, Tomislav Šojat, Ivan Havidić and Boris Leiner. Track listing included biggest hits of Pađen's career and bands he was a member of or worked with, like Aerodrom, Pađen Band, Azra, Parni Valjak, Film and Haustor.

Track listing
All music and lyrics written by Jurica Pađen, except noted.

Personnel 
Aerodrom
Jurica Pađen – Guitars, lead vocals
Tomislav Šojat – Bass, backup vocals, lead vocals on tracks 4, 7, 9 and 11
Ivan Havidić – Guitars, backup vocals
Boris Leiner – Drums

Additional musicians
Ana Šuto – Backup vocals on track 17

Artwork
Igor CC Kelčec – Photography and illustration

Production
Recorded by Juraj Havidić
Mixed by Juraj Havidić and Ivan Havidić
Mastered by Dragutin Smokrović – Smokva

References

External links
 Official Youtube channel

Aerodrom (band) albums
2009 live albums
Croatia Records albums